The list of shipwrecks in 1954 includes ships sunk, foundered, grounded, or otherwise lost during 1954.

January

4 January

10 January

17 January

22 January

26 January

February

4 February

6 February

11 February

12 February

13 February

19 February

24 February

27 February

March

1 March

8 March

10 March

18 March

25 March

26 March

30 March

April

7 April

15 April

18 April

May

2 May

9 May

10 May

11 May

14 May

15 May

17 May

18 May

22 May

25 May

26 May

30 May

June

4 June

27 June

28 June

July

3 July

9 July

10 July

12 July

15 July

16 July

19 July

21 July

26 July

27 July

31 July

Unknown date

August

7 August

8 August

13 August

19 August

27 August

28 August

29 August

30 August

31 August

Unknown date

September

9 September

13 September

15 September

16 September

19 September

21 September

22 September

25 September

26 September

28 September

October

4 October

7 October

8 October

9 October

14 October

23 October

25 October

26 October

30 October

31 October

November

12 November

14 November

15 November

26 November

27 November

28 November

29 November

30 November

December

12 December

15 December

18 December

20 December

21 December

23 December

31 December

Unknown date

Unknown date

References

See also 

1954
 
Ships